Leandro Blanc (born 2 May 1993) is an Argentine professional boxer who has held the South American light flyweight title since February 2020. As an amateur he represented his country at the men's light flyweight event at the 2016 Summer Olympics.

Boxing career
Blanc made his professional debut against Miguel Angel Maciel on 7 September 2019 in Lanús, Argentina. He won the fight by a fourth-round technical knockout. After winning his second professional bout against Mauro Ezequiel Quinteros by technical knockout as well, Blanc was scheduled to face Mauro Sapito Liendro for the vacant Argentina (FAB) light flyweight title on 7 February 2020. The bout was later cancelled for undisclosed reasons and Blanc was rescheduled to face Ramón Velásquez for the vacant South American light flyweight title a day later. He won his first professional title by a fifth-round technical knockout.

Blanc faced Juan Santiago Prado in a stay-busy fight on 6 March 2021. He beat his journeyman opponent by unanimous decision. Black next made his first South American title defense against Junior Leandro Zarate on 25 September 2021, at the Complejo Termal Vertiente de la Concordia in his native Concordia. As well as being a South American title defense, the vacant WBA Fedelatin and Argentina (FAB) light flyweight titles were on the line as well. Blanc won his first career step-up bout by technical decision, with scores of 105–104, 107–102 and 105–104. The fight was stopped in the eleventh round, due to a cut on Blanc caused by an accidental clash of heads.

Blanc faced German Valenzuela Barreras for the WBA Fedelatin light flyweight title on 24 June 2022, on the undercard of the "KO Drugs" event. He won the fight by split decision. Two of the judges scored the fight 96–93 for Blanc, while the third judge scored the bout 98–93 for Barreras. Blanc next faced Mauro Nicolas Liendro for the vacant South American light flyweight title on 22 October 2022. He captured the belt by unanimous decision, with all three judges scoring the bout 96–94 in his favor.

Professional boxing record

References

External links
 
 
 
 

1993 births
Living people
Argentine male boxers
Olympic boxers of Argentina
Boxers at the 2016 Summer Olympics
Place of birth missing (living people)
South American Games silver medalists for Argentina
South American Games medalists in boxing
Competitors at the 2018 South American Games
Light-flyweight boxers
Southpaw boxers
People from Concordia, Entre Ríos
Sportspeople from Entre Ríos Province